Van Anda, formerly spelled Vananda, is an unincorporated settlement on Texada Island in the northern Gulf of Georgia in British Columbia, Canada. As of 2021, it has a population of approximately 362 people. The surrounding region incorporates  Blubber Bay and Gillies Bay.

Name origin
Named after the Van Anda Copper & Gold Mining Company which owned  on the northeast side of the island, including the "Copper Queen" claim. 
President  Edward Blewett, a prominent American capitalist and miner, named both his son and this mining company after his wife, Carrie Van Anda (maiden name).

References

External links

Populated places in the qathet Regional District
Unincorporated settlements in British Columbia
Mining communities in British Columbia
Company towns in Canada
Ghost towns in British Columbia
Texada Island